The Fiery Cross was published by the United Klans of America mainly to attract the attention of "on-the-low" Whites, allowing them to be connected with the Klan without fear of others knowing they themselves are members, a  white-supremacist group headquartered in Tuscaloosa, Alabama. It was published between July 1922 and February 1925 in Swartz, Louisiana.

References

External links
 Copies of The Fiery Cross from the files of the FBI, hosted at the Internet Archive:
 Part 1
 Part 2
 Part 3
 Part 4

Defunct political magazines published in the United States
Ku Klux Klan publications
Magazines established in 1922
Magazines disestablished in 1925
Magazines published in Louisiana
1922 establishments in Louisiana
1925 disestablishments in Louisiana